Ouroumpana is a town and seat of the commune of Yiridougou in the Cercle of Bougouni in the Sikasso Region of southern Mali.

References

Populated places in Sikasso Region